Briscoe County is a county located in the U.S. state of Texas. As of the 2020 census, the population was 1,435. Its county seat is Silverton. The county was created in 1876 and later organized in 1892. It is named for Andrew Briscoe, a soldier during the Texas Revolution.

At one time, the large JA Ranch, founded by Charles Goodnight and John George Adair, reached into Briscoe County. After he left the JA, Goodnight owned the Quitaque Ranch. The prominent high school football and college coach Gene Mayfield was born in Briscoe County in 1928.

Caprock Canyons State Park and Trailway is located in Briscoe County.

Geography

Tule Canyon
Mackenzie Reservoir formed after water on Tule Creek was impounded. In 1972 the project was begun, just east of the site of the slaughter of the Indian ponies by Col. Ranald S. Mackenzie's Fourth Cavalry in 1874.

Major highways
  State Highway 86
  State Highway 207

Adjacent counties
 Armstrong County (north)
 Donley County (northeast)
 Hall County (east)
 Motley County (southeast)
 Floyd County (south)
 Swisher County (west)

Demographics

Note: the US Census treats Hispanic/Latino as an ethnic category. This table excludes Latinos from the racial categories and assigns them to a separate category. Hispanics/Latinos can be of any race.

As of the census of 2000, there were 1,790 people, 724 households, and 511 families residing in the county.  The population density was 2 people per square mile (1/km2).  There were 1,006 housing units at an average density of 1 per square mile (0/km2).  The racial makeup of the county was 83.35% White, 2.29% Black or African American, 0.39% Native American, 0.06% Asian, 11.45% from other races, and 2.46% from two or more races.  22.74% of the population were Hispanic or Latino of any race.

There were 724 households, out of which 29.30% had children under the age of 18 living with them, 59.30% were married couples living together, 7.60% had a female householder with no husband present, and 29.40% were non-families. 27.90% of all households were made up of individuals, and 16.00% had someone living alone who was 65 years of age or older.  The average household size was 2.47 and the average family size was 3.03.

In the county, the population was spread out, with 27.10% under the age of 18, 6.80% from 18 to 24, 22.00% from 25 to 44, 24.80% from 45 to 64, and 19.30% who were 65 years of age or older.  The median age was 40 years. For every 100 females there were 95.00 males.  For every 100 females age 18 and over, there were 92.80 males.

The median income for a household in the county was $29,917, and the median income for a family was $35,326. Males had a median income of $25,854 versus $17,500 for females. The per capita income for the county was $14,218.  About 11.50% of families and 16.00% of the population were below the poverty line, including 23.00% of those under age 18 and 12.50% of those age 65 or over.

Education
 Silverton Independent School District
 Clarendon Independent School District partial
 Turkey-Quitaque Independent School District partial

Communities
 Quitaque
 Silverton (county seat)

Politics

See also

 List of museums in the Texas Panhandle
 National Register of Historic Places listings in Briscoe County, Texas
 Recorded Texas Historic Landmarks in Briscoe County
 Llano Estacado
 Duffy's Peak
 Caprock Canyons State Park and Trailway
 Palo Duro Canyon
 Yellow House Canyon

References

External links
 Briscoe County
 Briscoe County in Handbook of Texas Online at the University of Texas
 Briscoe County Profile from the Texas Association of Counties
 Interactive Texas Map
 Texas Map Collection 
 Mackenzie Reservoir in Texas Parks & Wildlife
 Mackenzie Reservoir in Handbook of Texas Online
 Photos of West Texas and the Llano Estacado

 
1892 establishments in Texas
Populated places established in 1892
Texas Panhandle